The Nissan Diesel Space Runner 7 (kana:日産ディーゼル・スペースランナー7) is a light-duty bus produced by the Japanese manufacturer Nissan Diesel from 1994 to 2003. The range was primarily available as tourist coach.

Models 
U-EN210DAN (1994) - FE6E engine (195ps) and FE6TA engine (235ps)
KC-EN211DAN (1995) - FE6E engine (195ps)
KC-EN250DAN (1995) - FE6TA engine (235ps)
KK-EN252DAN (1999) - FE6TA engine (240ps)

External links

Buses of Japan
Space Runner 7
Vehicles introduced in 1994